Jhanduta Assembly constituency is one of the 68 assembly constituencies of Himachal Pradesh a northern Indian state. It is also part of Hamirpur, Himachal Pradesh Lok Sabha constituency.

Members of Legislative Assembly

Election candidates

2022

Election results

2017

See also
 List of constituencies of the Himachal Pradesh Legislative Assembly
 Bilaspur district, Himachal Pradesh
 Hamirpur, Himachal Pradesh Lok Sabha constituency

References

External links
 

Bilaspur district, Himachal Pradesh
Assembly constituencies of Himachal Pradesh